Vostochny is a rural locality (a khutor) in Polevoye Rural Settlement, Novoanninsky District, Volgograd Oblast, Russia. The population was 76 as of 2010. There are 4 streets.

Geography 
Vostochny is located in forest steppe on the Khopyorsko-Buzulukskaya Plain, 38 km north of Novoanninsky (the district's administrative centre) by road. Galushkinsky is the nearest rural locality.

References 

Rural localities in Novoanninsky District